Ortonville is an unincorporated community of Ventura County, California, United States. Ortonville lies north of the  unincorporated community Wadstrom and south of the  unincorporated community Weldons. All three were served by the 20th century Ventura and Ojai Valley Railroad.

Two mobile home parks are just north of the site of this historical Place name; Canon De Las Encinas Park and Magnolia Park.

References

Unincorporated communities in Ventura County, California
Unincorporated communities in California